Thomas Meredyth (c. 1680–2 — 14 January 1731/2) was an Irish Member of Parliament from Newtown, County Meath.

Biography
Meredyth was Chief Prothonotary of the Court of Common Pleas from 1701. He sat in the Irish House of Commons for Wexford from 1713 to 1714, for New Ross from 1715 to 1727, and for Navan from 1727 until his death. He was a Tory.

He was the son of Charles Meredyth, and the father of several children, including Charles, Dean of Ardfert; Henry, MP for Armagh; and Arthur Francis, MP for county Meath.

References

1680s births
1732 deaths
Members of the Middle Temple
Politicians from County Meath
Irish MPs 1713–1714
Irish MPs 1715–1727
Irish MPs 1727–1760
Thomas
Prothonotaries